The Ilyushin Il-102 was a Soviet experimental jet-powered ground-attack aircraft designed by Ilyushin. Once described as the "most gorgeously ugly combat jet ever," this aircraft was never chosen for production, being surpassed by the Su-25. Only a few development prototypes were built.

Design and development
In 1967, the Soviet Air Forces drew up a specification for a jet-powered shturmovik or armoured ground attack aircraft. While Sukhoi designed an all-new single seat aircraft, the Su-25, Ilyushin proposed a modified version of their Il-40 of 1953 under the designation Il-42, which, unlike the Sukhoi, was a two-seat aircraft with a remotely-controlled rear gun turret. The design was rejected by the Soviet Air Forces, but Ilyushin decided to continue in-house development regardless, renaming the programme Il-102.

The Il-102 first prototype flew on 25 September 1982, with a second airframe built for static tests, and carried out 250 test flights until it was grounded in 1984 when the engine life expired.

The Il-102 was a low-winged monoplane with moderately swept (30 degrees) wings, powered by two Klimov RD-33I turbofans (non-afterburning versions of the engines that power the Mikoyan MiG-29 fighter). It was highly unusual for its time in having a rear gun turret, something not seen in ground-attack aircraft since the World War II Il-2 Shturmovik and Il-10, the Il-102's spiritual ancestors, controlled remotely by a gunner sitting in a cockpit above the trailing edge of the wing. The crew cockpits, engines and fuel tanks were armoured to protect against ground fire.

Although development was abandoned in 1984, the prototype Il-102 was publicly unveiled at the 1992 Mosaeroshow air show at Zhukovsky, being claimed to be available for export. 

As of 2005, the prototype No. 10201 was placed on display at the Gromov Flight Research Institute.

Specifications

See also

References

Notes

Bibliography
"Ilyushin Il-102: Aborted jet shturmovik". World Air Power Journal, Volume 17 Summer 1994. London:Aerospace Publishing, 1994. . pp. 24–29.
Gunston, Bill. The Osprey Encyclopedia of Russian Aircraft 1875–1995. London:Osprey, 1995. .

External links

 Airliners.net Photos

Abandoned military aircraft projects of the Soviet Union
Anti-tank aircraft
Il-102
1980s Soviet attack aircraft
Low-wing aircraft
Twinjets
Aircraft first flown in 1982